Willowdale is a provincial electoral district in Toronto, Ontario, Canada. It elects one member to the Legislative Assembly of Ontario. It was created in 1987.

History
From 1987 to 1999, its boundaries were Bathurst Street to Finch Avenue to Yonge Street to Steeles Avenue to Leslie Street to the 401.

In 1996, it was redefined to consist of the part of the City of North York bounded on the north by the city limits (Steeles Avenue), and on the east, south and west by a line drawn from the city limits south along the eastern limit of the city, west along the hydro-electric transmission line situated south of McNicoll Avenue, south along Highway 404, west along Finch Avenue East, south along the Don River East Branch, west along Highway 401, northwest along the Don River West Branch, north along Bathurst Street, east along Drewry Avenue, north along Chelmsford Avenue, west along Greenwin Village Road, and north along Village Gate to the northern city limit.

From 2003 to 2018, it consisted of the part of the City of Toronto bounded on the north by the northern city limit (Steeles Avenue), and on the east, south and west by a line drawn from the city limit south along Victoria Park Avenue, southwest along the hydroelectric transmission line situated north of Apache Trail, south along Highway 404, west along Finch Avenue East, south along Leslie Street, southwest along Highway 401, northwest along the Don River West Branch, northeast along Bathurst Street, east along the hydroelectric transmission line situated north of Finch Avenue West and north along Yonge Street to the city limit.

This riding lost territory (36%) to Don Valley North, and gained territory from York Centre (16%) during the 2012 electoral redistribution.

Members of Provincial Parliament

|Sourced from the Ontario Legislative Assembly}}

Election results

2007 electoral reform referendum

References

Elections Ontario Past Election Results
Map of riding for 2018 election

Provincial electoral districts of Toronto
North York